The 2014 European Pairs Speedway Championship was the 11th edition of the European Pairs Speedway Championship. The final was held in Divišov, Czech Republic on 13 September. The Czech Republic won their fifth title.

Calendar

Rules
Semi-Final: 3 pairs will qualify to the Final
Germany Poland and Ukraine were allocated to the Final after finishing in the top three in 2013. The Czech Republic were allocated to the Final as hosts.

Semi-final
  Debrecen
 May 1

Final
  Divišov

See also 
 2014 Speedway European Championship

References 

2014
European Pairs